The Antioquia bristle tyrant (Pogonotriccus lanyoni) is a species of passerine bird in the family Tyrannidae.  It is endemic to Colombia. This species is sometimes placed in the genus Phylloscartes.

Its natural habitat is subtropical or tropical moist lowland forests.  It is threatened by habitat loss.

The species is named in honor of Wesley E. Lanyon.

References

External links
BirdLife Species Factsheet.

Antioquia bristle tyrant
Birds of the Colombian Andes
Endemic birds of Colombia
Antioquia bristle tyrant
Taxonomy articles created by Polbot